National Highway 106 (NH 106) is a highway in India running through the Indian state of Meghalaya. It connects Shillong and Nongstoin. The small stretch from Shillong to junction near Mylliem is part of Asian highway network AH1 and AH2.

See also
 List of National Highways in India (by Highway Number)
 List of National Highways in India
 National Highways Development Project

References

External links
NH 106 on OpenStreetMap

National highways in India
106
Transport in Shillong